Cheryl A. Sutton (born 23 September 1946 in Norwich) is a British archer.

Archery

Sutton finished 51st at the 1988 Summer Olympic Games in the women's individual event with 1179 points. She also finished fifth in the women's team event.

References

External links 
 Profile on worldarchery.org

1946 births
Living people
British female archers
Olympic archers of Great Britain
Archers at the 1988 Summer Olympics
Sportspeople from Norwich